Armatosterna is a genus of longhorn beetles of the subfamily Lamiinae, containing the following species:

 Armatosterna buquetiana (White, 1856)
 Armatosterna castelnaudi (Thomson, 1865)
 Armatosterna spinifera Jordan, 1894

References

Tragocephalini